Media Access Australia (M.A.A.) strives for accessibility and inclusion through technology and is a not-for-profit organization located in Australia dedicated to increasing access to websites and digital media for people with disabilities. This includes those who are deaf or hearing impaired, blind or vision impaired, or have a cognitive disability, as well as older Australians, such as those from non-English-speaking backgrounds, and people with varying levels of education and literacy.  

In addition to M.A.A.’s advocacy efforts, the organization helps provide clients with (digital accessibility services) provided by a team of media specialists that work with local, state and federal governments, corporations, educational institutions, and charities to help maximize engagement and inclusion for the broadest possible audience. 

M.A.A. works alongside organizations to audit, review, and implement accessibility, along with providing training for staff in best-practice digital access. The organization also runs a university-accredited online course – the Professional Certificate in Web Accessibility (P.C.W.A.) – that is run in six-week modules, with three to four intakes each year.

M.A.A. is also focused on audio-visual media, including streaming services, TV, cinema, DVDs and new media, by providing information about technological solutions that make audio-visual media accessible to people with disabilities. These solutions include audio description, captioning, and mainstream new media technologies. M.A.A .supports improvements in media access in Australia towards international best practice by identifying mainstream technological solutions and cost-effective ways to promote and implement them.

M.A.A. works collaboratively with consumer organizations; Government and industry in Australia and internationally.

Background 
Media Access Australia was formerly the Australian Caption Center (A.C.C.), co-founded by Adam Salzer and Alexandra Hynes in 1982. In 2005, A.C.C. sold its commercial operations, including captioning services to Red Bee Media, and became Media Access Australia (M.A.A.). M.A.A. is an independent not-for-profit organization that currently helps those with disabilities reach their full potential.

References

External links 
Media Access Australia
Media Access Australia: Audio Description

Organizations established in 1982
1982 establishments in Australia
Disability organisations based in Australia
Television organizations